New Jersey's 7th congressional district includes all of Hunterdon and Warren Counties; and parts of Morris, Somerset, Sussex, and Union Counties. The district is represented by Republican Thomas Kean Jr., who was first elected in 2022, defeating Democratic incumbent Tom Malinowski.

The district, which has become more ethnically diverse over time, is one of the most affluent congressional districts in the United States, with the fifth-highest median income in the nation.

Counties and municipalities in the district

For the 118th and successive Congresses (based on redistricting following the 2020 Census), the district contains all or portions of six counties and 93 municipalities.

Hunterdon County (24):
All 24 municipalities 

Morris County (12):
Chester Borough, Chester Township, Long Hill Township, Mendham Borough, Mendham Township (part; also 11th), Mine Hill Township, Mount Arlington, Mount Olive Township, Netcong, Roxbury Township, Washington Township and Wharton

Somerset County (13):
Bedminster Township, Bernards Township, Bernardsville, Branchburg Township, Bridgewater Township (part; also 12th), Far Hills, Green Brook Township, Hillsborough Township (part; also 12th), Peapack-Gladstone, Raritan, Somerville, Warren Township and Watchung

Sussex County (10):
Andover Borough, Byram, Fredon, Green Township, Hopatcong, Ogdensburg, Sparta, Stanhope, Stillwater, and Walpack

Union County (12):
Berkeley Heights, Clark, Fanwood, Linden (part; also 10th), Mountainside, New Providence, Rahway, Scotch Plains, Springfield, Summit, Westfield and Winfield Township

Warren County (22):
All 22 municipalities

History
In the 2012 general election, Republican incumbent Leonard Lance held his seat against Democratic challenger Upendra J. Chivukula. In the 2010 general election, Democratic challenger Ed Potosnak challenged Lance, but Lance defeated Potosnak by a margin of 59% to 41%. For the 2012 election, both Potosnak and former Edison Mayor Jun Choi announced their candidacies for the Democratic nomination. Choi dropped out of the race in December 2011 after redistricting left his Edison home outside the 7th District. Potosnak dropped out of the race in January 2012 to take a position as executive director of the New Jersey League of Conservation Voters, leaving a momentarily empty field for the Democratic nomination.

Effect of 2000 redistricting
New Jersey's 7th district and the 12th district were redistricted after the 2000 census by a bipartisan panel. By consensus of the panel, the Democratic and Republican parties agreed to trade areas in the two districts to make them safer for their respective incumbents. It is likely that this tradeoff, which made New Jersey's 7th less competitive for Democrats, had an effect on the outcome of 2006 election, which was decided by approximately 3,000 votes. Areas of the former 7th district such as Franklin Township that had historically voted reliably Democratic were moved into the adjacent 12th district in order to shore up Democratic incumbent Rush Holt, while reliably Republican Millburn was removed from the 7th, and instead split between the 10th and 11th districts. Additionally, heavily Democratic Plainfield was moved from the 7th to the already Democratic-leaning 6th district. Despite the redistricting, NJ-07 was still the most competitive House district in New Jersey, and was the only one considered to be in play in 2006 by political pundits.

In 2008, Mike Ferguson (who had first been elected in 2000, replacing Bob Franks) did not seek another term. Linda Stender won the Democratic nomination unopposed, while Republican primary voters chose State Senator Leonard Lance in a field of eight candidates. In the general election, Lance defeated Assemblywoman Linda Stender by a margin of 25,833 votes.

2018 election
In the Democratic primary Malinowski prevailed with 26,059 votes and 66.8% of the vote. Jacob finished second with 7,467 votes and 19.1% of the vote.

Lance won the Republican primary with 74.9%, and 24,856 votes.

In the 2018 election, Tom Malinowski, former Assistant Secretary of State for Democracy, Human Rights, and Labor, was considered the front runner among the Democrats challenging Republican incumbent Leonard Lance. Malinowski was endorsed by Westfield teacher/attorney Lisa Mandelblatt and attorney Scott Salmon when they withdrew from the race in February 2018. Other candidates in the Democratic primary included lawyer Goutam Jois; and social worker Peter Jacob, who was defeated by Lance in the 2016 election. Green Party of New Jersey member Diane Moxley also announced her intent to run for the seat. Lindsay Brown, a product manager at the New York Post and a self-described progressive, ran in the Republican primary against Lance. Berkeley Heights banking executive Linda Weber and environmental advocate David Pringle withdrew in March 2018.

During the fourth quarter of 2017, the Malinowski campaign raised $528,000 while the incumbent Lance raised $237,000. Jois raised $189,000 and Jacob raised $29,000.

Malinowski won the seat in the election with 51.7% of the votes.

2020 election 
Incumbent Tom Malinowski (D) ran in the Democratic party primary uncontested, winning 100% (80,334) of the vote. Challenger Thomas Kean Jr. (R) defeated Raafat Barsoom and Tom Phillips in the Republican party primary receiving 79.4% (45,395) of the vote.

Incumbent Tom Malinowski (D) defeated challenger Thomas Kean Jr. (R) in the general election by 1.2 percentage points for New Jersey's 7th Congressional District on November 3, 2020. The race was expected to be competitive, with New Jersey's 7th being one of 40 seats gained by Democrats in the 2018 midterm elections.

2022 redistricting and election 
The New Jersey Congressional Redistricting Commission altered the boundaries of the district effective January 6, 2022.   Although the district remains competitive, the district is more Republican than it was previously.

Incumbent Tom Malinowski (D) faced 2020 challenger Thomas Kean Jr. once again in 2022. In the general election held on November 8, 2022, Kean prevailed, unseating Malinowski. It was one of 18 districts that voted for Joe Biden in the 2020 presidential election while being won or held by a Republican in 2022.

Result statewide Election Results
Results Under Current Lines (Since 2023)

Results Under Old Lines

Recent election results

List of members representing the district

References

Bibliography

 Congressional Biographical Directory of the United States 1774–present

07
Essex County, New Jersey
Hunterdon County, New Jersey
Morris County, New Jersey
Somerset County, New Jersey
Union County, New Jersey
Warren County, New Jersey
Constituencies established in 1873
1873 establishments in New Jersey